Neil McIntosh (born 16 February 1974  in Glasgow, Scotland)  is a Scottish  journalist who is the Managing Editor of BBC Online. Previously, he worked for the Wall Street Journal, as Editor of Europe.WSJ.com at the site's launch on 9 February 2009. Prior to that, he was head of editorial development at Guardian Unlimited, The Guardian newspaper's website.

On 10 February 2021, McIntosh was announced as the next editor of The Scotsman newspaper.

An early advocate of blogging in journalism, he was once dubbed Britain's ‘Godfather of Blog’ after introducing Online Blog to the Guardian, with Jack Schofield and Victor Keegan in 2001, before being promoted to assistant editor of Guardian Unlimited in 2004. He set up a large network of weblogs for the Guardian, including Comment is free, and later established audio and video services for the site.

McIntosh was educated at Dunoon Grammar School, Argyll and Napier University, Edinburgh, and lives in London. He has an MBA from the Open University Business School.

Bibliography 

 McIntosh, Neil (2002) "Cyber Crime". Heinemann..
 As contributor, (2005) "2005: Blogged" Friday.

References

External links
Guardian Unlimited blogs
Guardian Unlimited podcasts
Guardian articles by Neil McIntosh
Completetosh personal blog by Neil McIntosh (defunct)

Scottish journalists
Alumni of Edinburgh Napier University
Alumni of the Open University
Living people
1974 births
People educated at Dunoon Grammar School
The Guardian journalists
BBC News people
The Scotsman people